Type 639 is a type of ocean surveillance ship is a type of oceanographic surveillance ship developed by China for its People's Liberation Army Navy (PLAN) to replace earlier Type 595. A single unit of Type 639 with pennant number Bei-diao 992 is currently in service as an oceanographic research ship and  five more modified version serving as hydrographic survey ships are designated as Type 639A. Type 639 has received NATO reporting name Kanhai class, 勘海 in Chinese, meaning Surveying Sea.

Type 639 is a SWATH design of 1500 tons of displacement with three anchors. In addition to the SWATH hull form, another unique feature of Type 639 oceanographic research ship is the adaptation of integrated electric propulsion system. Developed by China Shipbuilding Industry Corporation (CSIC), the subsystems are developed by various subsidiaries and divisions of CSIC. The ship is jointly developed by 701st (中国船舶重工集团公司第七零一研究所) and The 702nd Institute of CSIC (中国船舶重工集团公司第七零二研究所). The ship was built by Wuchang Shipbuilding Industry Co. Ltd (武昌船舶重工有限责任公司) of CASIC. The integrated electric propulsion system was the result of work of several CASIC subsidiaries and divisions, including Wuhan Machinery Plant Co. Ltd (武汉船用机械有限责任公司), Henan Diesel Engine Industry Co. Ltd (河南柴油机重工有限责任公司), Shanxi Fenxi Heavy Industry Co. Ltd. (山西汾西重工有限责任公司), Chongqing Huayu Electrical Instrumentation Plant (重庆华渝电气仪表总厂),Beijing Great Wall Electronic Equipment Co. Ltd. (北京长城电子装备有限责任公司), and the final integration of various subsystems of the integrated electric propulsion system is The 712th Institute of CSIC (中国船舶重工集团公司第七一二研究所). To meet the strict requirement, nearly a dozen new technologies were incorporated, most of them were for the first time in China. The most obvious visual feature of Type 639 oceanographic surveillance ship is that there is a well in the center to lower acoustic or other scientific equipment.

Type 639/639A series ships in PLAN service are designated by a combination of two Chinese characters followed by three-digit number. The second Chinese character is Shui (调), meaning research, or Ce (测), meaning survey, because these ships are classified either as oceanographic or hydrographic research. The first Chinese character denotes which fleet the ship is service with, with East (Dōng, 东) for East Sea Fleet, North (Běi, 北) for North Sea Fleet, and South (Nán, 南) for South Sea Fleet. However, the pennant numbers are subject to change due to changes of Chinese naval ships naming convention, or when units are transferred to different fleets.

References

Auxiliary surveillance ship classes
Auxiliary ships of the People's Liberation Army Navy
Military catamarans
Small waterplane area twin hull vessels